Jerry Moe is a counselor, author, trainer, and public speaker. He is a leader on issues for children living in families impacted by addiction and an advocate that recovery from addiction should include all family members. With a background in sociology, education and counseling, Moe developed a  program for kids ages 7 to 12 years old to teach them what addiction is, that they are not responsible for their parents’ illness and to provide them with safe space where they can talk openly with others their age who are going through the same experiences. His program was among the first of its kind and is nationally recognized and emulated by mental health professionals, treatment centers and organizations. He is world-renowned for his work with young children struggling with familial addiction and serves on the advisory board for the National Association of Children of Addiction (NaCOA).

Early life 
Jerry Moe grew up in San Francisco, the youngest of three children in a family that had struggled with addiction for many generations. At 14 he was starting to get into trouble when a teacher intervened and suggested he attend a program for teens affected by a loved one's drinking, Alateen. For the first time, Moe found himself surrounded by other kids his age going through the same experiences, feeling the same guilt, sadness, and confusion.  Eventually, Moe's mother began attending Al-Anon and shortly after, Moe's father obtained sobriety through Alcoholics Anonymous. He lived the last 38 years of his life sober. This experience exemplified for Moe the importance of recovery for the whole family.

Career 
Moe began his career in education and realized that young children ages 7 to 12 years old were left out of the recovery process altogether – often being the first to be affected but the last to receive help and support. From his firsthand experience of a childhood and adolescence marred by alcoholism came a deep understanding of why children in that age group might need a helping hand to cope and to avoid alcoholism – or drug dependency – themselves. Moe began developing a psycho-educational program for young children impacted by addiction and found support for the program at Sequoia Hospital in Redwood City, CA, where the new program was successfully piloted for a 6-month period. Jerry eventually brought his Children's Program to Sierra Tucson, in Tucson, AZ, a drug and alcohol rehab center where he served as Director of Children's Services for seven years.

National Director of Children’s Programs – Hazelden Betty Ford Foundation 
Moe began consulting for the Betty Ford Center, now part of the Hazelden Betty Ford Foundation in 1997 after he was contacted by former First Lady Betty Ford. Mrs. Ford was committed to family recovery for addiction, including the youngest people impacted.  The Betty Ford Center had recently received $2 million in donations from philanthropist Joan Kroc and Ronald McDonald Children's Charities, and these funds were to be used to develop a program for kids ages 7–12. Eventually Moe was hired to lead the program and joined the center full time. The Children's Program in Rancho Mirage is offered on campus and in elementary schools across the Coachella Valley. On average, the program sees about 1,500 children per year, with overn34,000 children and their family members completing the program.

Moe served as National Director of Children’s Programs at the Betty Ford Center until his retirement in 2021. The Children's Program expanded from Rancho Mirage, CA to Dallas, Texas, Denver, CO, and eventually Minneapolis, Minnesota. Moe continues to advocate for young children struggling with familial addiction, providing training and public speaking on recovery that includes all family members.

Professional Highlights 
In addition to his work at the Hazelden Betty Ford Foundation, Moe is one of the foremost experts on counseling for young children in families affected by addiction. He has written dozens of books and articles that are used by families and other professionals throughout the world. Moe has spoken in all 50 states and trained or presented in 24 countries.  He has also spoken at the White House and on Capitol Hill, and has been interviewed frequently by local, state and national media.

Moe's work helping young children in families facing addiction has been featured on Sesame Street, Nickelodeon and PBS. His work has also been featured on the Today Show, People Are Talking, NBC's Newsmagazine Cover to Cover, Good Morning, Texas, Nickelodeon News, Time, Parents, McCalls, YM, Parenting, Seventeen, and U.S. News & World Report magazines, as well as the Irish Times, Dallas Morning News, Chicago Tribune, Boston Herald, San Francisco Chronicle, Los Angeles Times, Los Angeles Daily News, Washington Post, New York Times,CNN and USA Today.

Since 2019, Moe has been a significant contributor to ‘Sesame Street in Communities’ and its Emmy- winning initiative on parental addiction. Other major media collaborations that brought huge exposure to the needs of kids in families with addiction included the award -winning 2005 PBS documentary Lost Childhood: Growing up in an Alcoholic Family and the 2010 Nickelodeon News special Under the Influence: Kids of Alcoholics, which won the Emmy Award in 2011. His latest book is 'Through a Child's Eyes: Understanding Addiction and Recovery'.

Moe lives with his family in Palm Desert, CA. He is a cancer survivor, father to three children and grandfather of four.

Positions Held 

 Formerly Director of Programs and Training, Kids Are Special, San Jose, CA.
 Founder, Sequoia Hospital's The Children's Place...The Heart of Recovery, 1978. A specially designed program for children, ages four to twelve, from alcoholic and other drug addicted families.
 Founder, Kids' Kamp-Hope and Recovery, 1985. Summer camp for children of alcoholics.
 Formerly Vice President, National Association for Children of Alcoholics. Currently an Advisory Board member.
 Board Member, American Society of Experiential Therapists.
 Faculty Member, University of California at Berkeley Extension, Alcohol and Drug Studies Certificate Program; California State University, Hayward, Chemical Dependency Certificate Program.
 National Director of Children’s Programs, Betty Ford Center, part of the Hazelden Betty Ford Foundation

Awards 

 1993 Recipient of the Marty Mann Award for outstanding contributions to the field of alcoholism and addiction awareness.
 1995 Recipient of the Promise Award for helping children grow up healthy, principled, and caring
 2000 Ackerman/Black Award from NACoA for “significantly improving the lives of children of alcoholics in the United States and around the world.”
 2005 America Honors Recovery Award from the Johnson Institute
 2012 Galetta Spirit of Recovery Award
 2013 Mona Mansell Award
 2013 Father Joseph C. Martin Award
 2015 The Game Ball Award, from PITCH4Kidz
 2017 The Beamer Award, from the Hazelden Betty Ford Foundation
 2018 Angels on Earth Award, from the Angel Light Academy
 2020 22nd Annual Firestone Award

Books and Articles
 Moe, Jerry & Johnson, Jeannette & Wade, Wendy. (2008). Evaluation of the Betty Ford Children's Program. Journal of Social Work Practice in the Addictions. 8. 464–489. 10.1080/15332560802310144. 
 Arria, Amelia M et al. “Integration of parenting skills education and interventions in addiction treatment.” Journal of addiction medicine vol. 7,1 (2013): 1–7. doi:10.1097/ADM.0b013e318270f7b0
 Moe, Jerry and Poheman, Don.  Kids' power:  Healing Games for Children of Alcoholics.  Tucson, AZ:  ImaginWorks,  1989.
 Moe, Jerry and Ways, Peter.  Conducting Support Groups for Elementary Children K-6: A Guide for Educators and Other Professionals.  Minneapolis, MN:  Johnson Institute, 1991.
 Moe, Jerry.  Discovery: Finding the Buried Treasure.  Dallas, TX: ImaginWorks, 1993.
 Brown, Cathey, LaPorte, Betty and Moe, Jerry.  Kids' Power Too!: Words to Grow By.  Dallas, TX:  ImaginWorks, 1996.
 Moe, Jerry and Ziegler, Ross.  The Children's Place.  Hong Kong:  QuinnEssentials Books & Printing Inc., 1998.
 Moe, Jerry.  Understanding Addiction and Recovery Through a Child's Eyes.  Deerfield Beach, FL:  Health Communications, Inc., 2007.

Films and Videos 
Champions for Children: Jerry Moe's Legacy and Alliance with First Lady Betty Ford

Jerry Moe helps children recover from the trauma caused by their parent's addictions

Addressing The Stigma Around Substance Use Disorders

Jerry Moe | How children make sense of trauma

SVG Families in Recovery Series

References

American nonprofit executives
Living people
People from Rancho Mirage, California
American male writers
Year of birth missing (living people)